Daniel Paul Franklin (born 1954)  is an American political scientist and Associate Professor of political science at Georgia State University in Atlanta, Georgia.

Franklin was born in Mt. Vernon, New York and grew up in Austin, Texas.  He received a BA in political science in 1976 from  the University of California, Los Angeles. He obtained an MA and a PhD  from the University of Texas, Austin in the years 1981 and 1984, respectively. He taught at Colgate University from 1985 to 1990, and was an APSA Congressional Fellow from 1990 to 1991. He then obtained his present position at Georgia State.

Publications
Franklin, Daniel P. Extraordinary Measures: The Exercise of Prerogative Powers in the United States. Pittsburgh, PA: University of Pittsburgh Press, 1991. According to WorldCat, the book is held in 432 libraries. 

Review by Elliot Bartky The Review of Politics, v56 n01 (19941205)
Franklin, Daniel P. (1993). Making ends meet : congressional budgeting in the age of deficits. Washington, D.C. : CQ Press, c1993. 
Review, by Jean Slemmons Stratford; Juri Stratford; Anne Liebst Journal of Government Information, v21 n4 (1994): 370-372
Review, by Christopher B Wlezien, The Journal of Politics, v56 n4 (1994 11): 1160-1161
Franklin, Daniel P., and Michael J. Baun. Political Culture and Constitutionalism: A Comparative Approach. Armonk, N.Y.: M.E. Sharpe, 1995. According to WorldCat, the book is held in 377 libraries. 

Review, by P Rich Southeastern Political Review, 24, no. 2, (1996): 374
Franklin, Daniel P. Politics and Film: The Political Culture of Film in the United States. Lanham: Rowman & Littlefield Publishers, 2006. 2nd ed., 2017. 
Review, by Doris A Graber Political Science Quarterly,  v121 n4 (20061225): 728-730
Review, by R Lawrence, Political Communication, 24, no. 4, (2007): 442-444
Franklin, Daniel P. Pitiful Giants: Presidents in Their Final Terms New York: Palgrave Macmillan, 2014.

References

Georgia State University faculty
Living people
American political scientists
1954 births
Colgate University alumni
University of Texas at Austin alumni